Ballinamore (meaning "mouth of the big ford") is a small town in County Leitrim, Ireland.

Etymology
, corrupted Bellanamore, means "town at the mouth of the big ford", so named because it was a main crossing (ford) of the Yellow River. The gaels called the baile Átha na Chuirre ("homestead of ford of the afflictions") because a hospital-house stood near the bridge in the 13th century.

Location
Ballinamore is in south county Leitrim,  from County Fermanagh, and built on the 'Yellow River'. The R202 regional road intersects the R199 and R204 roads here. A historic barge waterway, built in the 1840s to connect the Erne and Shannon rivers, was reopened for boat traffic in 1994 as the Shannon–Erne Waterway. Ballinamore has daily Local-link bus services to Carrick on Shannon and Dromod railway station Monday to Saturday.

History

After the 5th century, the Conmaicne settled this area, displacing and absorbing an older tribe named the "Masraigh". These Conmhaícne ancestors were called the "Cenel Luachán". This is the origins of Ballinamore.

In 1244, the town was named Ath na Chuirre ("ford of the afflictions") because, according to the Irish Annals, a hospital dedicated to Saint John the Baptist stood beside the ford. Saint Bridget's church, and holy-well, stood on a high hill one kilometre north of present-day town.

In 1256, the Battle of Magh Slecht occurred nearby, leading to the division of Bréifne between the O'Rourkes of North Leitrim and the O'Reillys of East Bréifne (modern-day County Cavan). 
 

Around 1693, Ballinamore Iron works was established, and in production until circa 1747 when the business was put up for sale, the assets including a furnace, forge, slitting mill, mine yards, coal yards, large quantities of pig iron, mine and coals. The native Irish forests bounding the parish were exhausted for this mining.

In the 18th century, dispossessed Catholics from County Down settled in the area.

In 1860, the Ballinamore and Ballyconnell Canal was opened, but declined in use after 24 October 1887, the date Ballinamore railway station opened. The railway station was part of the narrow gauge Cavan and Leitrim Railway and was the hub of the line, with the locomotive depot and works. It was the point where the line from Dromod through Mohill and Ballinamore to Belturbet branched to Kiltubrid, Drumshanbo and Arigna. The railway line was used until closure on 1 April 1959.

In the 19th, and early 20th centuries, annual fairs were held at Ballinamore on- 12 May, and 12 November.

In 1925, Ballinamore town comprised 163 houses, approximately 28 being licensed to sell alcohol.

In 1994, the Ballinamore and Ballyconnell Canal was reopened as the Shannon–Erne Waterway and marketed as a tourist/cruising waterway.

Annalistic references

Various Irish Annals mention the baile of Ath na Cuirre, i.e. Ballinamore, in 1244AD. A Connachta army marched from Fenagh, County Leitrim towards the baile, presumably along the R202 route. At the Yellow river ford, today's bridge into main street, the soldiers vandalised the nearby Hospital of Saint John the Baptist, accidentally killing one of their own, an important leader of Clann Murtagh O'Connor named Mhaghnusa mic Muircertaig Muimnigh.

".

[text: Annals of Lough Ce https://celt.ucc.ie/published/T100010A/text010.html]

Notable features
The local Church of Ireland church is the oldest building in Ballinamore in the 1780s from the ruins of the local Roman Catholic Church (St Patrick's) demolished during the reformation and penal laws.

The nearby Ballinamore Estate was granted to the Ormsby family in 1677. Elizabethan settlers located at first in County Sligo, from where they spread into Counties Mayo, Roscommon and Galway. The Ballinamore branch were descended from the Ormsby of Comyn or Cummin in County Sligo.

There is a monument to the IRA Chief of Staff, TD, and local councillor John Joe McGirl on the bridge crossing the Shannon-Erne Waterway.

Sport

Ballinamore Seán O'Heslin's GAA are the local Gaelic games club.

Popular culture
Christy Moore released a song called The Ballad of Ballinamore in 1984, giving the writing credits to Fintan Vallely.  Later compilations have referred to the song as simply Ballinamore.  The song was a parody of an earlier Irish rebel song called The Man from the Daily Mail.  It was written after an RTÉ investigation in the Ballinamore area for evidence of the abducted racehorse Shergar (believed to be abducted by the Provisional IRA) found several locals refusing to say anything other than "no comment".

See also
 List of towns and villages in Ireland
 Conmaicne Luchan

Notes and references

Notes

Primary sources

Secondary sources

External links 

Official website

 
Towns and villages in County Leitrim
Places of Conmaicne Luacháin